Pinré is a town in the Méguet Department of Ganzourgou Province in central Burkina Faso. It has a population of 2,023.

References

Populated places in the Plateau-Central Region
Ganzourgou Province